The Kuki People's Alliance ( KPA) is an Indian state-level political party in Manipur. It was formed by former Indian Foreign Service officer Tongmang Haokip and Wilson L Hangshing on January 12, 2022. The party won 2 seats in the 2022 Manipur Legislative Assembly election. The KPA is mainly based on the interests of the Kuki people. KPA supported BJP in Manipur and became an ally of BJP in its government.

References 

Political parties in Manipur
Political parties established in 2022